Monsignor Crescente Errázuriz Valdivieso (November 18, 1839 – July 5, 1931) was a Chilean Dominican friar, Roman Catholic archbishop of Santiago, professor, writer and historian. Crescente Errázuriz was of Basque descent.

Life 
He was born in Santiago, Chile the sixth child of Francisco Javier de Errázuriz y Aldunate and of his second wife, Rosario Fernández de Valdivieso y Zañartu (sister to Archbishop Rafael Valentín Valdivieso.) He studied at the school of the Fernández Díaz sisters and the Justino Fagalde school, in Santiago and from there he attended the Santiago Seminary in 1851. He graduated in Theology and Law. Subsequently, he decided to embrace the ecclesiastical career. He became a priest on December 18, 1863, and was appointed editor of the La Revista Católica (Catholic magazine). In 1874 founded a new magazine called El Estandarte Católico (Catholic banner) in order to defend the church position and respond to the liberal attacks. One year earlier, he had also become a member of the Faculty of Theology of the University of Chile, teaching canon law, and writing the standard text on the subject.

In 1885, he left the university to seclude himself in the Recoleta Domínica convent, adopting the name of Raimundo. There he was put in charge of the library, which he transformed in the most important private library in Chile. In 1898, he became the convent abbot, position he retained until 1907. During his time in the convent, he published his massive Los Orígenes de la Iglesia Chilena (Origins of the Chilean church), which made him the premier church historian. Due to his publications and researches, he was incorporated to the Royal Academy of the Spanish Language. He was also given the gold medal of the Historical and Geographical Society of Chile in 1912, and became the president of the Chilean Academy of History in 1914. In 1916, he returned to his position in the university.

In 1918 he was nominated as Archbishop of the Santiago archdiocese by president Juan Luis Sanfuentes. Monsignor Errázuriz was considered a peace offering in preparation for the heated presidential campaign of 1920, even though he was already 71 years old. Pope Benedict XV named him on December 30, 1918, adopting the motto: Cruz et Evangelium ecce arma mea.

He promoted a policy to make the Catholic Church independent from the conservative party. In 1920 he proposed the creation of the bishoprics of Valparaíso and Talca. In 1924 he presided over the separation of the church and the state, consecrated in the Constitution of 1925. He was the voice that gave serenity and long-term vision to the negotiations. Monsignor Errázuriz died in 1931 at the age of 91.

Ecclesiastical life

See also 
 Maximiano Errázuriz
 History of Chile

References

External links 
 Biography 
 Catholic Hierarchy
 Article on his nomination as Archbishop 
 Genealogical chart of Errázuriz family 

1839 births
1931 deaths
Crescente Errazuriz
Chilean people of Basque descent
20th-century Roman Catholic archbishops in Chile
Participants in the First Vatican Council
Roman Catholic bishops of Santiago de Chile